This is a list of hydroelectric power stations in Guatemala: The list is incomplete. The Guatemalan Electricity regulating Authority CNEE also has a listing on their website.

*) Building costs in millions of US$

References 

 
Lists of buildings and structures in Guatemala
Guatemala,Hydro
Guatemala